Senator Pacheco may refer to:

Marc Pacheco (born 1952), Massachusetts State Senate
Romualdo Pacheco (1831–1899), California State Senate